Heikki Jauhopää (died 1586), was a Finnish cunning man, who was executed for witchcraft.

He was a famous folk magician, who were often male in Finland at this time period and both respected and feared. Jauhopää was widely known for his ability and feared because he was rumoured to use it for malign purposes.

He was put on trial in Kemi, accused of having caused the death of several people by magic. He was accused of three different people, who claimed that he had caused the illness and death of a daughter, a farmhand and two cows respectively, after having had some kind of conflict with Jauhopää. His own wife Maarit
testified against him, and stated that she hed left him but had been forced to return after he had caused her to give birth to snakes.

In Finland, witch trials were normally against one single male folk magician who was accused of having caused death or illness by use of magic, without any reference to Satan. The trial of Heikki Jauhopää was typical in this sense. However, normally the man was given some lesser punishment than the death penalty. Heikki Jauhopää was however considered unusually dangerous, and he was sentenced to death by decapitation for having caused death by use of magic on 9 July 1586. In this time period, it was uncommon to have death sentences in witch trials in Finland, which normally ended in fines rather than a death sentence.

References

 https://www15.uta.fi//yky/arkisto/historia/noitanetti/hjauhopaa.html 
 Pohjanmaan vuoden 1586 sakkoluetteloon (VA 4777 fol. 93–94) Suomen historian dokumentteja 1. (Toim. Mikko Juva & Vilho Niitemaa & Päiviö Tommila. Helsinki 1968, 228-229

1586 deaths
Witch trials in Finland
16th-century executions
People executed by decapitation
People executed for witchcraft